Assassin's Creed is a comic book series set in the fictional Assassin's Creed universe. It was written by Kill Shakespeare and Sherlock Holmes vs. Harry Houdini writers, Anthony Del Col and Conor McCreery, and published by Ubisoft and Titan Comics. Trial by Fire is the first volume of Assassin's Creed comic series followed by Volume 2: Setting Sun and Volume 3: Homecoming.

Reception
Assassin's Creed: Trial by Fire has received generally positive reviews. PSU.com called Trial by Fire #1 "[a]n intriguing first chapter in the ongoing Assassin's Creed comic book series that shows great promise." The series has been recognized by The Guardian as example of one of the best game-comics, and was featured and reviewed on numerous websites such as Bleeding Cool, Slackjaw Punks, and Flickering Myth.

Notes

External links
 Trial by Fire #1 on Comic Vine
 

2015 comics debuts
Comics based on Assassin's Creed
Ubisoft games